Hyptiastis is a genus of moths in the family Lecithoceridae.

Species
 Hyptiastis clematias Meyrick, 1911
 Hyptiastis microcritha Diakonoff, 1954

References

Natural History Museum Lepidoptera genus database

Lecithoceridae